The Night Flier (also known as Stephen King's The Night Flier) is a 1997 American horror film based on the 1988 short story of the same name by Stephen King. Directed and co-written by Mark Pavia, the film stars Miguel Ferrer as Richard Dees, a tabloid reporter who, while investigating a series of murders committed in airfields, begins to suspect that the killer may be a vampire.

The Night Flier was filmed on location in Wilmington, North Carolina. It premiered in the United States on HBO on November 7, 1997, receiving a theatrical release by New Line Cinema the following year.

Plot
Richard Dees is a cynical tabloid reporter whose motto is "Never believe what you publish and never publish what you believe." Merton Morrison, editor-in-chief at the tabloid Inside View, confides a case to him about a bloody murder in a rural airfield, committed by a passing aviator who thinks he is a vampire and registered under the name of Dwight Renfield. Dees refuses, but reverses his decision when two more murders are committed in another airfield, the victims drained of their blood. He recovers the case from Morrison who, in the meantime, had entrusted it to the novice reporter Katherine Blair, and leaves in the footsteps of the killer aboard his own light aircraft.

Dees gathers accounts, pays bribes and even desecrates a grave for the purposes of his investigation. He senses that the case is stranger than it seems and receives messages telling him to stop his investigation. Dissatisfied with Dees' attitude, Morrison sends Blair to conduct her own parallel investigation. Dees offers the young woman to join forces to hunt down the killer.

They find his trail at the Wilmington airfield and, as he no longer needs her, Dees abandons Katherine to continue alone. He lands at Wilmington and finds Renfield's Cessna Skymaster with dirt inside and the interior covered in blood. The airfield seems deserted, but Dees finds several massacred people. After taking photographs, he goes to the bathroom to vomit and is surprised by Renfield, who reveals his face and turns out to truly be a vampire. Renfield destroys Dees' photographic film and forces him to drink a little of his blood, which gives Dees visions of all the victims coming back as zombies. In a trance, he attacks the bodies with an axe and is shot by the police officers who arrived on the scene with Blair. She sees Renfield get on his plane and take off but, adopting Dees' motto, she publishes an article that portrays Dees as the killer.

Cast
 Miguel Ferrer as Richard Dees
 Julie Entwisle as Katherine Blair
 Dan Monahan as Merton Morrison
 Michael H. Moss as Dwight Renfield
 John Bennes as Ezra Hannon
 Beverly Skinner as Selida McCamon
 Rob Wilds as Buck Kendall
 Richard K. Olsen as Claire Bowie
 Elizabeth McCormick as Ellen Sarch

Production

Writing and casting
The Night Flier is based on the 1988 short story of the same title by Stephen King. Jack O'Donnell, who co-wrote the film alongside director Mark Pavia, said that, "Mark and I wanted to keep this film as close to the story as possible. Obviously, a 40-page short story is going to need to be filled out to turn it into a feature film." The character of Katherine Blair was added to the screenplay when O'Donnell, Pavia, and King decided to include "a younger rookie for Dees to play off of."

Miguel Ferrer, who plays Richard Dees, first met King during the production of the 1994 miniseries The Stand. Ferrer became aware of the Night Flier adaptation about a year prior to the film's production, when The Stand director Mick Garris informed him that he was being considered for a role in it. Ferrer was not familiar with the short story at the time, and stated that, "I went out and got it and read it, and I thought, 'Well, this is a great story, but I don't see a movie here,' you know what I mean? I didn't get it; I didn't see what they were going to do with it. So I spoke to Stephen and Mark, and I got the script and I thought, 'This is a really, really ingenious adaptation.

The name of the vampire in the film, Dwight Renfield, is derived from American actor Dwight Frye and his role as Renfield in the 1931 English-language film Dracula.

Filming
The Night Flier was shot on location in Wilmington, North Carolina. The production lost a day when Hurricane Bertha made landfall in the state in July 1996. Pavia stated that, "I was pretty worried that we might lose some sets that we had just built, but we were lucky. We inspected them the day after the hurricane hit and they were fine. Some of the detail had gotten lost, some of the landscaping had changed, but overall it didn't really affect us."

Special effects
The special effects and prosthetic makeup for the film was provided by KNB EFX Group. Moss recalled that, when he first auditioned for the role of Renfield, "I didn't know I would be in full makeup with the jaws and stuff. All I had were the [written] scenes, which I had been given for the audition. So I immediately felt how sad this man is, to have to be immortal and fly around and land in places with some kind of anonymity and all off people to feed, and I thought that aspect of him really was the most attractive [thing about the role]. But later, when I found out about all the rest of the stuff, I went, 'Oh, cool!

Release
The film, which was independently financed by European investors, attracted strong interest from Paramount Pictures. Due to a crowded release schedule, the studio could only bring the film to theaters in time for Halloween 1998. Director Mark Pavia and producer Richard P. Rubinstein opted not to take Paramount's offer, as keeping the film on the shelf until October 1998 would break obligations they had with their European investors. The Night Flier would instead premiere in the United States on HBO on November 7, 1997 (it had previously received a worldwide premiere in Italy during May of that year). The film was later picked up by New Line Cinema for an American theatrical release on February 6, 1998, where it performed poorly.

The Night Flier was first released on DVD by HBO Home Video on May 27, 1998. Since then the film has been released multiple times by HBO and Warner Home Video, and once distributed by Mosaic Movies in 2000.

Reception
On Rotten Tomatoes, the film holds an approval rating of 33% based on six reviews, with a weighted average rating of 4.1/10.
On Metacritic, which assigns a normalized rating to reviews, the film has a weighted average score of 36 out of 100 based on seven critics, indicating "generally unfavorable reviews".

Stephen Holden of The New York Times gave the film a negative review, criticizing the film's poor adaptation and lack of thrills, citing Ferrer's performance as the film's sole strength. Lisa Schwarzbaum from Entertainment Weekly  wrote, "Once the easy joke about the fellowship of bloodsuckers has sunk in and the versatility of latex in the creation of gore has been demonstrated, there's not much else going on [...] What personality there is comes from Ferrer, who, with a belligerent glower, throws himself into the role of the soul-dead reporter with a full-blooded intensity that's almost more than this undead caper can handle."

Leonard Maltin gave the film a score of 2.5/4 stars, complimenting the film's "Genuinely creepy mood" and Ferrer's performance, but criticized the final third of the film. Lael Loewenstein from Variety gave the film a positive review, writing, "The Night Flier is a creepy vampire tale that also offers some clever commentary on bloodthirsty tabloid journalists."

Cancelled sequel
A sequel script entitled Fear of Flying was written by Pavia and King in the mid-2000s, focusing more on the Katherine Blair character as well as the origins of the Night Flier killer. However, the duo failed to gain the required 10 million dollars in financing from Hollywood studios, due to the original 1997 film being viewed as merely a minor cult hit.

References

Bibliography

External links
 
 
 

1997 horror films
1997 films
1990s supernatural films
American supernatural horror films
American aviation films
Films about journalism
Films about photojournalists
Films based on short fiction
Films based on works by Stephen King
Films set in airports
American vampire films
1990s English-language films
1990s American films